Ghulam Mustafa Tabassum, (4 August 1899 – 7 Feb 1978) was a 20th-century poet. His pen name was Tabassum.

He is best known for his many poems written for children, as the creator of the Tot Batot character, and as the translator of many poetical works from mostly Persian into Punjabi and Urdu languages.

Early life and career
Sufi Tabassum was born on 4 August 1899 in Amritsar, Punjab, to parents of Kashmiri ancestry. He earned a master's degree in Persian language from Forman Christian College (FCC) in Lahore, Pakistan. He worked for and remained with Government College Lahore for his entire career, rising to head the Department of Persian Studies in 1943. Tabassum retired from Government College in 1954.

Sufi Tabassum was also closely associated with the members of an informal literary circle called Niazmandan-i-Lahore. This circle's members included Pakistan's noted literary personalities including Patras Bokhari, Abdul Majeed Salik, Imtiaz Ali Taj, M. D. Taseer, Chiragh Hasan Hasrat, Hafeez Jalandhari, Abdur Rahman Chughtai and Majeed Malik. Sufi Tabassum also edited the magazine Lail-o-Nahar for a while in addition to working for Radio Pakistan, Pakistan Arts Council and Iqbal Academy.

In Pakistan, he is considered to be a pioneer in children's poetry. His popular poems for children are Totbatot and Jhoolnay.

His poetry featured on radio and television
For fifty years, he was actively participating on Radio Pakistan and Pakistan Television poetry events. His poems were used as the lyrics of several songs sung by Noor Jehan, Naseem Begum, Farida Khanum and Ghulam Ali.

Awards and recognition
 In 1962, he received the Pride of Performance Award from the President of Pakistan
 In 1966, he received the Tamgha-e-Nishan-e-Sipaas award of the Government of Iran.
 He was also awarded the Sitara-i-Imtiaz, Award (Star of Excellence) by the President of Pakistan.

Works (partial list)
 Tot Batot Collection. Published by Ferozsons (no date), 
 Ab Sab Hain Tot Batot Mian, Published by Gulzar Ahmed, 2000
 Jhoolnay (collection of poems for children), Published by Ferozsons (no date)
 Doguna. Published by Ferozsons (a translation of the works of Hazarat Amir Khusrow)
 Sawan Raina Da Sufna, a translation into Punjabi of Shakespeare's A Midsummer Night's Dream, unknown publisher
 Talmatol (collection of poems for children)
 Daman-i-Dil
 Kulliyaat-i-Sufi Tabassum (Poetry in Urdu language)
 Nazraan Kardiyaan Gallaan (Poetry in Punjabi language)
 Naqsh-i-Iqbal (Punjabi translation of Allama Iqbal's poetry)

Death
Sufi Ghulam Mustafa Tabassum died in Lahore, Pakistan on 7 February 1978.

References

Pakistani dramatists and playwrights
Urdu-language poets from Pakistan
Forman Christian College alumni
Pakistani poets
Persian-language poets
Writers from Amritsar
Punjabi-language poets
Punjabi-language writers
Punjabi people
1899 births
1978 deaths
Academic staff of the Government College University, Lahore
Recipients of the Pride of Performance
Recipients of Sitara-i-Imtiaz
Poets in British India
Poets from Lahore
20th-century British poets
Pakistani songwriters
Pakistani radio personalities
Pakistani children's writers
Pakistani people of Kashmiri descent